(born September 22, 1951, in Tomakomai, Hokkaido, Japan) is a retired trainer of Thoroughbred race horses. He had been a licensed trainer in Japan since 1987 and since 1993 has won the training title eleven times.

He has trained three horses that were voted Japanese Horse of the Year on four occasions: Taiki Shuttle (1998), Symboli Kris S  (2002, 2003) and Zenno Rob Roy (2004). Currently Fujisawa is the trainer of Casino Drive who won the 2008 Peter Pan Stakes at Belmont Park in New York.

Fujisawa retired from horse training on February 28, 2022 as he had reached the age of retirement, with his stable winning the 1,570th race on the day of his retirement. The horses that belonged to the Fujisawa stable at the time were transferred to Masayoshi Ebina's newly created stable.

Major wins
 France
 Prix Jacques le Marois - (1) - Taiki Shuttle (1998)

 Japan
 Arima Kinen - (3) - Symboli Kris S (2002 & 2003), Zenno Rob Roy(2004)
 Asahi Hai Futurity Stakes - (2) - Bubble Gum Fellow (1995), Satono Ares (2016)
 Hanshin Sansai Himba Stakes - (2) - Stinger (1998), Soul Stirring (2016)
 Japan Cup - (1) - Zenno Rob Roy (2004)
 Mile Championship - (4) - Shinko Lovely (1993),  Taiki Shuttle (1997 & 1998), Zenno El Cid (2001), Gran Alegria (2020 & 2021)
 NHK Mile Cup - (1) - Symboli Indy (1999)
 Oka Sho - (2) - Dance in the Mood (2004), Gran Alegria (2019)
 Sprinters Stakes - (1) - Taiki Shuttle (1997), Gran Alegria (2020)
 Takamatsunomiya Hai - (1) - Shinko King (1997)
 Tenno Sho (Autumn) - (5) - Bubble Gum Fellow (1996), Symboli Kris S (2002 & 2003), Zenno Rob Roy (2004), Spielberg (2015)
 Tokyo Yūshun (Japanese Derby) - (1) - Rey de Oro (2017)
 Victoria Mile - (1) - Dance in the Mood (2006), Gran Alegria (2021)
 Yasuda Kinen - (2) - Taiki Blizzard (1997), Taiki Shuttle (1998), Gran Alegria (2020)
 Yushun Himba (Japanese Oaks) - (1) - Soul Stirring (2017)

References
 National Thoroughbred Racing Association (United States)

Japanese horse trainers
1951 births
People from Tomakomai, Hokkaido
Living people